Cotoneaster cambricus (wild cotoneaster; Welsh: Creigafal y Gogarth "rock apple of Gogarth") is a species of Cotoneaster endemic to the Great Orme peninsula in north Wales. It is the only species of Cotoneaster native to the British Isles. It has never been found naturally at any other location. In the past, it was included within the widespread eastern European Cotoneaster integerrimus, but differs from that in genetic profile.

The flowers are produced in corymbs of one to four (occasionally up to seven) together in early to mid-spring (earlier than on C. integerrimus), each flower  diameter, with five white to pale pink petals. The fruit is a red pome   diameter, containing two or three seeds. The seed has a very low germination rate.

Status
Cotoneaster cambricus is critically endangered, with only six plants known in the wild, which are not regenerating naturally. This number has been supplemented in recent years by an additional 11 cultivated plants, grown from cuttings and seeds. Reintroduction has so far only had limited success; the 11 additional are the only survivors of 33 plants grown and planted out. The Biodiversity Action Plan for the species calls for this to be increased to 100 plants by 2030. Specimens are also cultivated in a number of botanical gardens. Historically, the species was much more abundant on the Great Orme when it was discovered in 1783. The population was reduced in the 19th century by collectors deliberately digging up plants for their gardens. More recently overgrazing pressure by sheep, feral goats, and rabbits has reduced size of existing plants, reduced flowering and prevented those new seedlings that have developed from establishing themselves. They have also been facing competition from invasion seedlings of other species of Cotoneaster arising from cultivated plants in gardens in nearby towns. It has full legal protection under Schedule 8 of the Wildlife and Countryside Act 1981.

References

cambricus
Endemic flora of Wales